Levinella is a genus of sponges belonging to the family Levinellidae.

The species of this genus are found in Europe, Africa and Australia.

Species:

Levinella prolifera 
Levinella thalassae

References

Clathrinida
Sponge genera